Summer: The Donna Summer Musical is a jukebox musical with book by Colman Domingo, Robert Cary, and Des McAnuff and music and lyrics Donna Summer, Giorgio Moroder, Pete Bellotte, Paul Jabara, and others, based on the life of Summer.

The musical made its premiere at the La Jolla Playhouse in November 2017 and opened on Broadway in April 2018.

Productions
The La Jolla Playhouse presented the musical in a limited engagement from November 7 until December 24, 2017.

The musical premiered on Broadway at the Lunt-Fontanne Theatre on March 28, 2018 (previews), prior to an April 23, 2018 opening. The musical is directed by Des McAnuff, with scenic design by Robert Brill, costumes by Paul Tazewell, lighting by Howell Binkley, projections by Sean Nieuwenhuis, sound by Gareth Owen, and was produced by Tommy Mottola and Thalía. The musical closed on Broadway on December 30, 2018 after 289 performances.

The First National tour opened September 29, 2019. The tour started at the RBTL Auditorium in Rochester, New York. The cast featured Dan’yelle Williamson (Diva Donna), Alex Hairston (Disco Donna), and Olivia Elease Hardy (Duckling Donna).

The Second National Tour opened November 15, 2021. Launching at the Benedum Center in Pittsburgh, PA. The cast featured Brittny Smith (Diva Donna), Charis Gullage (Disco Donna), and Amahri Edward-Jones (Duckling Donna).

In July 2022, Norwegian Cruise Line announced its at-sea tour of the musical aboard the all new Norwegian Prima, which premiered in August. The cast features Kimberley Locke (Diva Donna), Valerie Curlingford (Disco Donna), and D'Nasya Jordan (Duckling Donna).

Broadway Licensing acquired the rights for all future stock and amateur performances.

Overview
The musical highlights Donna Summer at three stages of her life. Duckling Donna is in her pre-teens, starting out in Boston; Disco Donna, in her late teens and 20s, has her initial success; Diva Donna is in her 50s and at the top of her career.

Musical numbers

 The Queen Is Back- Diva Donna & Ensemble
 I Feel Love- Diva Donna and Ensemble 
 Love to Love You Baby- Disco Donna & Female Ensemble
 I Remember Yesterday- Duckling Donna & Sisters
 On My Honor - Duckling Donna
 Faster and Faster to Nowhere - Disco Donna & Ensemble
 Munich: Jesu, Joy of Man's Desiring / White Boys / Love to Love You Babe (Reprise) - Diva Donna, Disco Donna, and Ensemble
 MacArthur Park- Diva Donna, Disco Donna, Duckling Donna, and Ensemble
 Heaven Knows- Disco Donna and Bruce Sudano
 No More Tears (Enough Is Enough)- Diva Donna, Disco Donna, and Duckling Donna
 Pandora's Box- Duckling Donna, Diva Donna and Ensemble
 On the Radio- Disco Donna, Diva Donna

 I Love You- Bruce Sudano, Disco Donna, Mimi Sudano
 Bad Girls- Disco Donna and Female Ensemble
 She Works Hard for the Money- Full Company
 Dim All the Lights- Disco Donna, Joyce Bogart and Ensemble 
 I Believe in Jesus- Disco Donna and Ensemble
 Unconditional Love- Diva Donna, Mimi, Brooklyn and Amanda Sudano
 To Turn the Stone- Disco Donna, Diva Donna
 Stamp Your Feet- Diva Donna and Ensemble
 Friends Unknown- Diva Donna
 Hot Stuff- Disco Donna and Ensemble
 Last Dance- Full Company

Cast

Awards and nominations

Original Broadway production

Notes

References

External links
Internet Broadway Database Listing

2017 musicals
Broadway musicals
Biographical musicals
Cultural depictions of American women
Cultural depictions of pop musicians
Donna Summer
Jukebox musicals
Plays set in the 20th century